Roza Ivanovna Makagonova (28 October 1927 – 18 April 1995) was a Soviet actress. Makagonova was awarded as a Meritorious Artist in 1976.

Biography
Makagonova was born in 1927 in Samara. In 1951, she finished  the Gerasimov Institute of Cinematography and until 1990, she worked in the governmental theater of actors in Moscow. She was married to Vladimir Basov. She died in Moscow on 18 April 1995, aged 67.

Selected filmography
The Village Teacher (1947) as Masha
Far from Moscow (1951)  as Zhenya
Marina's Destiny (1953) as Nastuska
Certificate of Maturity (1954) as Cinderella
No Ordinary Summer (1956) as Anna Parabukina
The Adventures of Elektronik (1979)  as singing lessons teacher
The Shroud of Alexander Nevsky (1992) as Vorobyov's neighbor

Dubbing roles
The Little Mermaid (1968)
Flying Phantom Ship (1969) as Mrs Kuroshio
Hans Christian Andersen's The Little Mermaid (1975) as Marina (in Russian language dubbing)

References

External links
 Roza Makagonova at kinopoisk.ru
 Roza Makagonova at rusactors.ru

1927 births
1995 deaths
Actors from Samara, Russia
Soviet film actresses
Soviet voice actresses
Russian film actresses
Russian voice actresses
Gerasimov Institute of Cinematography alumni
Honored Artists of the RSFSR
20th-century Russian actresses